Cowboys Cry for It 1925 is a short film comedy starring Stan Laurel.

Directed by Clyde Bruckman.

References
A History of the Hal Roach Studios Escrito por Richard Lewis Ward
Who was who on screen Escrito por Evelyn Mack Truitt

External links
IMDB

American silent short films
American black-and-white films
1925 comedy films
1926 films
1925 short films
1925 films
Silent American comedy films
American comedy short films
1920s American films
1920s English-language films